Birgit Irma Gunborg Friggebo (born 25 December 1941) is a Swedish politician and member of the Liberal People's Party. Born in Falköping, she married economics professor Bo Södersten in 1997.

Friggebo was Minister for Planning in the Ministry of Housing between 1976 and 1978 and Minister for Housing between 1978 and 1982. Between 1991 and 1994 she was Minister for Culture (including immigration issues). She was a member of the Swedish Parliament between 1979 and 1982 and yet again between 1985 and 1997. From 1998 to 2004, she was the governor for the County of Jönköping.

Legacy 
As Minister for Housing, she removed the need for a planning approval to build small sheds under 15 square meters of area. Such sheds are now popularly known as "friggebod", a pun on her surname, bod meaning shed.

As Minister for Culture and Immigration, she appeared in a televised debate held in Rinkeby on the serial sniper John Ausonius's reign of terror. During the debate she stood up and tried to get the crowd consisting mostly of non-white immigrants to sing "We Shall Overcome". The incident was widely regarded as an embarrassment and a public relations debacle and showed the alienation felt by many immigrants vis-à-vis the centre-right coalition government.

References

1941 births
Living people
People from Falköping Municipality
Swedish Ministers for Housing
Swedish Ministers for Culture
Members of the Riksdag from the Liberals (Sweden)
Women government ministers of Sweden
County governors of Sweden
21st-century Swedish women politicians
Members of the Riksdag 1979–1982
Members of the Riksdag 1985–1988
Women members of the Riksdag
Women county governors of Sweden
20th-century Swedish women politicians
20th-century Swedish politicians
Swedish Ministers for Gender Equality